Sanig (also Romanized as Sānīg; also known as Sanich, Sānīchābād, Sānieh, Sānīgābād, Sūnich, and Sūnieh) is a village in Pishkuh Rural District, in the Central District of Taft County, Yazd Province, Iran. At the 2006 census, its population was 226, in 93 families.

References 

Populated places in Taft County